Frederick Charlton Houldsworth (29 May 1911 – 1994) was an English footballer who played in the Football League for Reading, Swindon Town and Stoke City.

Career
Houldsworth was born in Henley-on-Thames and began his career with Swindon Town in 1934. He played 34 times for Swindon before joining Stoke City in April 1935. Whilst he kept a clean sheet against Grimsby Town in his first match for Stoke he conceded five against Preston North End and was not retained. He then joined Ipswich Town where he used as a reserve and left in 1938 for Reading without having made an appearance. At Reading he played in eight matches before he served with the Army during World War II. During the war he guested for Southampton, making 21 appearances in the War League and Cup matches between 1941 and 1944.

Career statistics
Source:

References

English footballers
Stoke City F.C. players
Ipswich Town F.C. players
Swindon Town F.C. players
Reading F.C. players
Southampton F.C. wartime guest players
English Football League players
1911 births
1994 deaths
Brentford F.C. wartime guest players
Association football goalkeepers